Symmoca latiusculella is a moth in the family Autostichidae. It was discovered by Henry Tibbats Stainton in 1867. It is found in Lebanon and Syria.

References

Moths described in 1867
Symmoca